Hubert Nathan Myers and Clifford Williams are two African American men exonerated for First-Degree Murder and attempted murder after 42 years due to eyewitness misidentification, ineffective assistance of counsel and official misconduct. They are the first exonerees freed based on an investigation by a Conviction Integrity Unit in Florida.

Conviction 
They were convicted only on the testimony of one of the victims Nina Marshall, who was shot alongside Jeanette Williams who was killed.

Exoneration 
Both men were exonerated after 42 years due to eyewitness misidentification, ineffective assistance of counsel and official misconduct. They are the first exonerees freed based on an investigation by a Conviction Integrity Unit in Florida.

Compensation for wrongful conviction 
Only Hubert Nathan Myers is eligible for compensation for wrongful conviction due to Florida's  "Clean Hands Provision" which only allows compensation if a person is "not convicted of another violent felony or more than one non-violent felonies."

References 

People convicted of murder by Florida
Overturned convictions in the United States
American people convicted of murder